The Capitol Limited is a daily Amtrak train between Washington, D.C., and Chicago, running  via Pittsburgh and Cleveland. Service began in 1981 and was named after the Baltimore and Ohio Railroad's Capitol Limited which ended in 1971 upon the formation of Amtrak. It carries the Amtrak train numbers 29 and 30, which were previously assigned to the discontinued National Limited.

During fiscal year 2019, the Capitol Limited carried 209,578 passengers, down 4.3% from FY2018. The train had a total revenue of $18,973,626 in fiscal year 2016, down 0.7% from FY2015.

In October 2020, Amtrak temporarily reduced service on all long-distance routes, including the Capitol Limited, to three days per week due to the COVID-19 pandemic. Regular daily service was restored on May 31, 2021, with funding from the American Rescue Plan.

History 

On October 1, 1981, Amtrak stopped running the Shenandoah, which connected Washington, D.C., and Cincinnati, Ohio, and began running the Capitol Limited. Amtrak's version of the CL ran over the same route as the B&O's train east of Pittsburgh, but west of Pittsburgh it ran combined with the Chicago-New York Broadway Limited over the former Pennsylvania Railroad's Pittsburgh, Fort Wayne and Chicago Railway. Its numbers, 440 (eastbound) and 441 (westbound), were derived from the Broadway Limited's 40 and 41 and the new train also used Heritage Fleet equipment. The new train replaced the Broadway Limiteds former Washington section which had diverged at Philadelphia, Pennsylvania.

In late 1984, the Capitol Limited re-equipped with new Amfleet II coaches but also lost its full diner east of Pittsburgh.

Beginning with the October 26, 1986, timetable, Amtrak split up the Capitol Limited and Broadway Limited. The Capitol Limited continued to operate over the same route, regained a full diner east of Pittsburgh (which it had lost in 1984), received new train numbers (29 and 30, which had been assigned to the defunct National Limited), and a later schedule.

On November 12, 1990, trains were rerouted west of Alliance, Ohio, due to Conrail's desire to abandon part of the former PFW&C in northwestern Indiana; the Capitol Limited now uses the former Pennsylvania Railroad Cleveland and Pittsburgh (C&P) line north from Alliance through Hudson, Ohio, to Cleveland route. The Broadway Limited and its successor, the Three Rivers, were re-routed over the B&O's Chicago-Pittsburgh route. In October 1994, Amtrak, with great fanfare, relaunched the Capitol Limited with a new bilevel Superliner II consist.

On February 16, 1996, an eastbound rush-hour MARC commuter train headed to Washington Union Station collided with the westbound Capitol Limited near Georgetown Junction on a snow-covered stretch of track just west of Silver Spring, Maryland. Eleven people died aboard the MARC train in the accident. Three died of injuries suffered in the impact; the rest were killed by smoke and flames. The MARC engineer and two conductors were among the dead.

In November 2014, Amtrak, in the face of extreme delays, filed a complaint with the Surface Transportation Board, against CSX and Norfolk Southern, due to the frequency of extreme delays caused by freight train interference.

On April 19, 2018, Amtrak announced that it would discontinue full-service dining aboard the train on June 1. Instead of hot meals prepared on the train and served to diners in the dining car, sleeper passengers were now served a selection of primarily cold pre-packaged boxed meals, served in a "Sleeper Lounge". In January 2019, Amtrak expanded the boxed meal service to offer a full continental buffet at breakfast (with hot options such as oatmeal and breakfast sandwiches), and multiple hot entrées for lunch and dinner.

 Through cars 
Between 1984 and 1986 and again from 1991 to 1993, the Capitol Limited exchanged a Chicago-Miami coach with the New York-Miami Silver Star at Washington, D.C.

During 1997 and part of 1998, Amtrak operated the Capitol Limited in conjunction with the Southwest Chief, a daily Los Angeles–Chicago service. The two trains used the same Superliner equipment sets, and passengers traveling on both trains could remain aboard during the layover in Chicago. Originally announced in 1996, Amtrak planned to call this through service the "National Chief" with its own numbers (15/16), although the name and numbers were never used. Amtrak dropped the practice with the May 1998 timetable.

This route was mentioned amongst five others in the July 2010 issue of Trains magazine as slated for performance improvement, and as part of its federally mandated analysis of the worst-performing long-distance routes, Amtrak determined that reinstating a through-car connection with the Pennsylvanian would result in the highest gain in monetary and customer service measurements of possible options. To implement this, Amtrak had plans to operate a Viewliner sleeping car, an Amfleet cafe car and two Amfleet coaches between Chicago and New York via the Capitol Limited and Pennsylvanian, beginning sometime in 2011. Trains magazine picked up on this in their January 2011 issue, citing that a switch would be re-installed to give the thru-cars access to parallel track. Issues cited with providing such a service included a consist switch in Pittsburgh (shuffling sleeper and coach positions so that the transition sleeper was in the rear), an eight-hour layover on Sundays due to the Pennsylvanian'''s 1:20p departure (since eliminated), and a lack of Viewliner sleepers (delivery of new Viewliner II sleepers was delayed by several years).

 Former stops 

The Capitol Limiteds original routing west of Pittsburgh included Ohio stops in Canton, Crestline, and Lima; and Indiana stops in Fort Wayne, Valparaiso, and Gary. Amtrak dropped Gary as a station stop on April 28, 1985. On April 27, 1986, Amtrak added Warsaw, Indiana, located between Valparaiso and Fort Wayne. All these cities lost service when Amtrak re-routed the Capitol Limited north through Toledo on November 11, 1990. For a year, a dedicated bus connection was offered between Fort Wayne and Waterloo, Indiana.

Between March 2, 1982, and April 7, 1991, the Capitol Limited stopped in McKeesport, Pennsylvania, located in the Monongahela Valley southeast of Pittsburgh. At the time the Port Authority of Allegheny County operated the "PATrain" commuter rail between McKeesport and downtown Pittsburgh. The Port Authority ended the service in 1989, citing low ridership. Amtrak followed suit a year later, noting that on average one passenger boarded at McKeesport per trip during the train's final months of service at that station. Station platform track was subsequently removed, and the facility became an all-bus terminal.

Route details
 
Between Washington and Pittsburgh, the Capitol Limited mostly follows the historic B&O route along narrow river valleys hemmed in by steep slopes, including the upper Potomac, Youghiogheny, and Monongahela Rivers. Rail trails parallel much of this route, often on the opposite banks. The route straightens and levels out from Ohio onward.

Westbound trains leave Washington before the afternoon rush and arrive in Chicago in the morning, while eastbound trains leave Chicago in early evening and arrive in Washington in early afternoon.

The Capitol Limited'' operates over the following Amtrak, CSX Transportation, and Norfolk Southern Railway trackage:
Amtrak Washington Union Station, part of the Northeast Corridor
CSX Metropolitan Subdivision, Cumberland Subdivision, Cumberland Terminal Subdivision, Keystone Subdivision, Pittsburgh Subdivision, and P&W Subdivision, Washington to Pittsburgh
NS Pittsburgh Line and Fort Wayne Line, Pittsburgh to Alliance
NS Cleveland Line, Alliance to Cleveland
NS Chicago Line, Cleveland to Chicago
Amtrak Chicago Union Station

Ridership

Equipment 

The Capitol Limited uses Superliner equipment. As of July 2018, a typical train consists of:

 2 GE P40DC/P42DC locomotives
 1 Viewliner II baggage car
 1 Superliner Transition Sleeper
 2 Superliner sleepers
 1 Superliner dining car or diner-lounge
 1 Superliner Sightseer Lounge
 1 Superliner coach-baggage car
 2 Superliner coaches

In late 2014, with delays due to freight train interference resulting in equipment shortages, Amtrak modified the consist, in order to create a fourth train set, which included two sleeping cars, two coaches, and a combined diner-lounge, and the removal of the baggage car, sightseer lounge car, a sleeping car, and a transition dormitory. Complaints, however, resulted in Amtrak reverting to their standard consist.

References

Notes

Further reading

External links 

Amtrak routes
Night trains of the United States
Passenger rail transportation in Washington, D.C.
Passenger rail transportation in Maryland
Passenger rail transportation in West Virginia
Passenger rail transportation in Pennsylvania
Passenger rail transportation in Ohio
Passenger rail transportation in Indiana
Passenger rail transportation in Illinois
Railway services introduced in 1981
Long distance Amtrak routes